Dinera grisescens is a species of bristle fly in the family Tachinidae. It is found in North America and Europe.

References

Further reading

External links

 

Dexiinae
Articles created by Qbugbot
Insects described in 1817